Futbola klubs Auda is a Latvian football club, playing in the highest division of Latvian football (Latvian Higher League). They are based in Ķekava, near the capital, Riga. Auda won their first ever major trophy in 2022, beating RFS 1–0 in the final of the Latvian Cup.

History

The history of Auda started in the 1960s when the football team of the kolhoz 9. maijs appeared in the lower divisions of the Latvian championships. This team played its matches in Vecmīlgrāvis in the stadium now called by the name of the former Latvia national football team captain Alberts Šeibelis. The club played in the lower divisions of Latvian football, its only seasons in the top league came in 1986–1987 but those also didn't bring good results.

In the late 1980s the name of the kolhoz was changed to Auda and the name of the football team was also changed. In 1991, under the management of Valerijs Leitāns and Juris Docenko, Auda made its debut in the top division of the Latvian championships. In a competition among 20 teams, Auda finished 15th. The following season, Latvian football team RFK was reformed on the basis of the Auda squad. Under this name the team, including many young players, participated in 1. līga (the second division of Latvian football). But results which would correspond to the name of RFK didn't come so in 1995 the team reverted to its former name of Auda. In 1996 Auda was a completely new team which played in the 2nd division. In 1997 the young Auda players won their second division zone and in the finals in two games lost to the second team of FK Valmiera. The following season Auda played in the 1st division. After several years in this league Auda finished first and were promoted to the Virslīga. After several seasons in the Virslīga, Auda was relegated to the 1st division. On 15 October 2005 Auda played its first game in its new stadium in Ķekava.
In 2007 FK Auda and FK Alberts united as FK Auda/Alberts. The main joint team plays in 1. līga as FK Auda but FK Auda/Alberts, the former FK Auda-2(farmclub), plays in the 2. līga. The latter club has joined with FK Alberts and uses FK Auda second squad players and FK Alberts players.

On 19 October 2022, Auda won their first ever major trophy, beating RFS 1–0 in the final of the Latvian Cup, thanks to a goal from Daniils Ulimbaševs. This also secured them European football for the first time in their history, where they will compete in the following season's Europa Conference League.

European

Notes
 QR: Qualifying round

Honours

Latvian Cup
Winners: 2022

Players

First-team squad
As of 11 March, 2023.

External links
 Official website

Auda Alberts
Auda
1991 establishments in Latvia